Captain Norman Craig Millman was a Canadian First World War flying ace credited with six aerial victories.

He joined the Royal Flying Corps in May 1916. He began his pilot's career as an instructor and test pilot. He was posted to 48 Squadron to fly a Bristol F.2 Fighter on 20 August 1917. He became a flight commander, then rose to command the unit. While there, he drove six enemy planes down out of control between 11 November 1917 and 8 March 1918. He left the squadron in May 1918, and became an instructor back in England.

References

1890 births
1981 deaths
Canadian World War I flying aces